Pistorius or Pistor (from Latin pistor meaning miller or baker) are Latinized surnames, corresponding to the Dutch Bakker or the German Becker. Notable people with the surname include:

Pistorius 

 Boris Pistorius (born 1960), German politician
Calie Pistorius, Vice-Chancellor and Principal of the University of Pretoria
 Caren Pistorius, South African actress
 Charlotte Pistorius (1777 – 1850), German poet
 Hermann Andreas Pistorius (1730 – 1798), German Protestant-Lutheran theologian and philosopher
 , German artist
 Johannes Pistorius (disambiguation) refers to three 16th century bearers of that name 
 Martin Pistorius, South African web designer and author
 Micki Pistorius (born 1961), South African forensic psychologist and author
 Oscar Pistorius (born 1986), South African double-amputee athlete and convicted murderer

Pistor 

 Johann Jakob Pistor, 18th-century German general who served in the Imperial Russian army
 Ludger Pistor (born 1959), German actor

See also 

 Demian, a novel by Hermann Hesse, in which one of the characters is named Pistorius
 Pastorius (disambiguation)

Afrikaans-language surnames
Surnames of German origin
Occupational surnames